Michael Edward Cole (born 9 June 1937) is a former English footballer who played as a full-back.

Career
Cole began his career at non-league club Harwich & Parkeston, before joining Norwich City in 1955. Cole remained with the club for three years, making three Football League appearances. In 1958, Cole joined Chelmsford City.

References

1937 births
Living people
Association football defenders
English footballers
Footballers from Ilford
Harwich & Parkeston F.C. players
Norwich City F.C. players
Chelmsford City F.C. players
English Football League players